Phellodon confluens, commonly known as the fused cork hydnum, is a species of tooth fungus in the family Bankeraceae. It was originally described in 1825 as Hydnum confluens by Christiaan Hendrik Persoon. Czech mycologist Zdenek Pouzar transferred it to the genus Phellodon in 1956. The fungus is found in Asia, Europe, and North America. It is considered vulnerable in Switzerland.

References

External links

Fungi described in 1825
Fungi of Asia
Fungi of Europe
Fungi of North America
Inedible fungi
confluens
Taxa named by Christiaan Hendrik Persoon